Javier Demarcus "Marcus" Oliver (born February 8, 1995) is an American football linebacker who is currently a free agent. He played college football at Indiana.

College career
Oliver was ranked 67th at his position and 81 overall prospect in the state. After receiving six offers from Boston College, Cincinnati, Toledo, Miami (OH), Eastern Illinois and Indiana. Oliver signed with Indiana on December 6, 2012.

During his freshman season Oliver didn't see much playing time but still excelled. In three game played he recorded 11 total tackles and a pass deflection. In his final two years at Indiana Oliver was a main part and contributor in the Hoosiers defenses. Recording 183 tackles, 5 sacks, 5 forced fumbles, 2 inceptions, 7 pass deflections in his sophomore and junior years.

After Indiana's 2016 Foster Farms Bowl loss to the Utah Utes in which Oliver did not play. Oliver announced he would not be returning for his final year of eligibility at Indiana and entered the 2017 NFL Draft.

Professional career

Philadelphia Eagles
After going undrafted in the 2017 NFL Draft Oliver signed with the Philadelphia Eagles, but was waived after rookie mini-camp.

Atlanta Legends
Oliver was signed by the Atlanta Legends of the Alliance of American Football, but was waived before the start of the 2019 regular season.

References

External links
 Indiana bio
 Marcus Oliver on Twitter

1995 births
Living people
Indiana Hoosiers football players
Philadelphia Eagles players
Atlanta Legends players